A value meal is a group of menu items at a restaurant offered together at a lower price than they would cost individually. They are common at fast food restaurants. A typical value meal includes a main dish (e.g., burger, wrap), a side dish (e.g., french fries) and a soft drink. Value meals are a common merchandising tactic to facilitate bundling, up-selling, and price discrimination. The perceived creation of a "discount" on individual menu items in exchange for the purchase of a "meal" is also consistent with the Loyalty Marketing school of thought. Additionally, the term is based on value theory, which utilizes certain marketing tactics to encourage people to spend more money than they originally intended on their purchase.

See also
 Combination meal

References 

Restaurant terminology
Fast food
Pricing
Bundled products or services